Isai Limen was a port town of Magnesia in ancient Thessaly, mentioned in the Periplus of Pseudo-Scylax.

Its site is unlocated.

References

Populated places in ancient Thessaly
Former populated places in Greece
Ancient Magnesia
Lost ancient cities and towns